Earl Carpenter (born 9 May 1970) is an English musical theatre actor and a singer, recognized chiefly for his work in London's West End. He is known for his performances as Javert in the stage musical Les Misérables and as the title character in the West End production of The Phantom of the Opera. In 2012, he played The Phantom in the 25th Anniversary UK Tour, replacing John Owen-Jones, who left the tour in September. He made his return to Broadway in May 2015, reprising his role of Inspector Javert and recently a new show in Singapore. 

He had the part of The Bishop of Digne in Les Misérables in Concert: The 25th Anniversary at the O2 Arena. He also played the Auctioneer in The Phantom of the Opera at the Royal Albert Hall. He is widely known for his rich, deep singing voice.

He is also known for his work in Ginger Boy Productions. In 2018, he funded and produced a production of Disney's Peter Pan Jnr at the Regent 
Centre in Christchurch, Dorset.

Training
 Jellicoe Theatre, Bournemouth and Poole College
 Poole College of Further Education

Television
As part of the 25th anniversary of The Phantom of the Opera, Earl performed the title song at The Royal Variety Performance – held in The Lowry, Manchester – on Monday 5 December 2011. Performing alongside Nicole Scherzinger, Earl was joined by three other former Phantoms (Simon Bowman, John Owen-Jones, and Ramin Karimloo). The performance was aired on ITV1 on Wednesday 14 December 2011.

Stage work

Major Theatre Credits

Other Theatre Credits
 Between the Lines – Roger Flint – Palace Theatre, Westcliff-on-Sea
 Wolfgang Amadeus Mozart – Mozart – Winter Gardens Theatre, Bournemouth
 Dick Whittington – King of Dreams / Sultan of Morocco – Theatre Royal, Plymouth
 Her Benny – Jazzer – Empire Theatre, Liverpool
 Joseph and the Amazing Technicolor Dreamcoat – Simeon – Thorndike Theatre, Leatherhead
 Robin Prince of Sherwood – King Richard / Will Scarlett / Robin Hood (Understudy)
 West Side Story – Riff – Winter Gardens, Bournemouth
 The Ultimate Illusion – Bournemouth Youth Theatre (Best Young Actor's Award 1988)
 You, Me And Mrs Jones – Bournemouth Youth Theatre
 Oklahoma – Poole Arts Centre
 Merchant of Venice – Jellicoe Theatre, Bournemouth
 Measure for Measure – Jellicoe Theatre, Bournemouth
 The Glass Menagerie – Tom – Jellicoe Theatre, Bournemouth
 The Dumb Waiter – Gus – Jellicoe Theatre, Bournemouth
 Journey's End – Hibbert – Jellicoe Theatre, Bournemouth
 Luther – Jellicoe Theatre, Bournemouth
 The Tempest – Prospero –  Jellicoe Theatre, Bournemouth
 Julius Caesar – Brutus – Jellicoe Theatre, Bournemouth
 Hitler Dances – Hans – Jellicoe Theatre, Bournemouth
 Tales From The Vienna Woods – Eric – Jellicoe Theatre, Bournemouth
 Bugsy Malone – Snake Eyes – Southampton Mountbatten Theatre
 Hampshire Tales – Tom – Forest Forge Theatre Company
 My Lady of Ellingham – Robert – Forest Forge Theatre Company
 The Happiest Days of Your Life – Hopcroft Minor – Ringwood Musical and Dramatic Society

Concerts
 Les Misérables: The Staged Concert - The Bishop of Digne/Bamatabois, u/s Javert - Gielgud Theatre/Sondheim Theatre
 Three Phantoms – UK, Scandinavia, Macau, China and Singapore
 The Phantom of the Opera at the Royal Albert Hall – The Auctioneer  – Royal Albert Hall
 Les Misérables in Concert: The 25th Anniversary – The Bishop of Digne – The O2
 Last Night of the Christmas Proms 2007 – Portsmouth Guildhall, Southampton Guildhall, Exeter Great Hall, Poole Lighthouse
 Christmas at the Musicals – Royal Concert Hall, Glasgow and Nottingham
 Hot Summer Classics – Wilton House, Salisbury
 Last Night of the BSO Proms – Portchester Castle, Fareham and Upton House, Poole
 Encore – Buxton Opera House
 Last Night of the Christmas Proms 2006 – Southampton Guildhall, Bristol Colston Hall, Poole Lighthouse, Portsmouth Guildhall, Exeter Great Hall
 Encore – Madinat Jumeirah, Dubai
 West End at Home – Mayflower Theatre, Southampton and Lighthouse Poole
 Summer Showstoppers – Osborne House, Isle of Wight
 Last Night of the Christmas Proms 2005 – Portsmouth Guildhall, Bristol Colston Hall, Poole Lighthouse, Exeter Great Hall
 One Enchanted Evening – Weymouth Pavilion, Southampton Guildhall, Bournemouth Pavilion
 The Best of the West End – Buxton Opera House
 Live and Let Die – Meyrick Park, Bournemouth
 The Last Night of the Christmas Proms 2004 – Portsmouth Guildhall, Poole Lighthouse, Southampton Guildhall, Exeter Great Hall, Bristol Colston Hall
 Les Misérables in Concert – Windsor Castle Entente Cordiale Celebration
 Chess in Concert- The Russian – Bournemouth International Centre
 Les Misérables in Concert – Courfeyrac – Bournemouth International Centre
 Les Misérables in Concert – Hylands Park, Chelmsford
 Closing Ceremony of Euro '96 – Wembley Stadium

Film
 From the Diaries of Jojo the Dog Faced Boy
 Les Misérables in Concert: The 25th Anniversary
 The Phantom of the Opera at the Royal Albert Hall
 Les Misérables: The Staged Concert

Recordings
 Musical Mad
 Disney's Beauty and the Beast – Original London Cast Recording
 The Witches of Eastwick – Original London Cast Recording
 Sunset Boulevard – UK Tour Promotional Recording
 Act One: Songs From The Musicals Of Alexander S. Bermange
 Les Misérables – 25th Anniversary Tour Cast Recording

Association with theatre industry organisations

He has been creative producer and owner of Ginger Boy Productions Limited since 2006; patron and associate artist to the Mayflower Theatre in Southampton and as has recently accepted a visiting professorship at Solent University.

References

External links
 

1970 births
Living people
English male musical theatre actors